The 1961 Six Hour Le Mans was an endurance motor race for sports cars and sedans. It was staged at the Caversham circuit in Western Australia on Monday, 5 June 1961.

Results

The winning car covered a record 187 laps (385 miles / 620 km) despite the fact that it rained throughout the race.

References

Around The Houses, © 1980
A History of Australian Motor Sport, © 1980

Six Hours Le Mans
Six Hour Le Mans
June 1961 sports events in Australia